First Congregational Church in Beloit, Wisconsin was built in 1859 from a design by Lucas Bradley, blending elements from Greek Revival and Romanesque Revival styles. It was added to the National Register of Historic Places for its architectural significance on January 23, 1975. On August 24, 1998 the historic building was damaged by fire, after which it was razed and replaced with a new building, which is pictured.

References

Churches on the National Register of Historic Places in Wisconsin
Congregational churches in Wisconsin
Romanesque Revival church buildings in Wisconsin
Churches completed in 1859
Churches in Rock County, Wisconsin
Buildings and structures in Beloit, Wisconsin
National Register of Historic Places in Rock County, Wisconsin